Poraj is a Polish Coat of Arms. Used by several knighthood families of medieval Poland and noble families of the Polish–Lithuanian Commonwealth - those descended in the male-line from the Poraj family and those allowed into the heraldic clan by adoption.

History
The Poraj coat of arms is of Bohemian origin. The name comes from the progenitor of the Polish clan Prince Poraj (Pořej), brother of Adalbert of Prague, son of the Bohemian Duke Slavník. According to a legend the sons of Duke Slavník bore the coat of arms of roses, each in a different color.

Prince Poraj came to Poland with the procession of Dobrawa of Bohemia, the spouse of Mieszko I of Poland and settled down in Greater Poland.

Blazon
Gules, a rose Argent barbed Vert seeded Or.

Notable bearers
Notable bearers of this Coat of Arms include:
Jan Gruszczyński, Primate of Poland and Viceroy
Jan Bodzanta, Bishop of Kraków
Bogufał I, Bishop of Poznań
Bogufał II, Bishop of Poznań
Bogufał III z Czerlina, Bishop of Poznań
Benedykt Izdbieński, Bishop of Poznań
Franciszek Antoni Kobielski, Bishop of Lutsk
Maciej Garnysz, Bishop of Chełmno
Stanisław Pstrokoński, Bishop of Chełmno
Piotr Goryński, Voivode of the Duchy of Masovia
Jan Samuel Chrzanowski, lieutenant colonel
Adam Mickiewicz, national poet, see: Three Bards
Wincenty Kadłubek, Bishop of Kraków and chronicler
Roman Grodecki, professor at the Jagiellonian University
House of Kurozwęcki
Krzesław Kurozwęcki, Grand Chancellor of the Crown and Bishop of Kujawy
Dobiesław Kurozwęcki, Voivode of Krakow
Stanisław Kurozwęcki, Vice-Chancellor of the Crown
Zawisza Kurozwęcki, regent of the Kingdom of Poland
Dobiesław "Lubelczyk" Kurozwęcki, Voivode of Lublin
Mikołaj "Lubelczyk" Kurozwęcki, Voivode of Lublin
Krzesław Kurozwęcki, castellan of Nowy Sacz
Piotr Kurozwęcki, Court Marshal of the Crown
Krzesław "Półtorabek" Kurozwęcki, starost of Krakow
Adam Kurozwęcki, starost of Brzeziny
Janusz Zakrzeński, film and theatrical actor
Stanislaw Chlebowski, painter
Józef Biernacki, general, participant of the Kosciuszko and November Uprisings
Alojzy Prosper Biernacki, Chancellor of the Exchequer during the November Uprising
Andrzej Boryszewski, Archbishop of Lwów, Primate of Poland
Mikołaj Róża Borzyszowski, Crown Master of the Kitchen, castellan of Małogoszcz
Hieronim Bużeński,  Grand Treasurer of the Crown
Antoni Madeyski, sculptor
Andrzej Madeysk, engineer, associate professor
Jerzy Madeyski, art historian
Adam Gruszczyński, judge, castellan of Gniezno
Włodzimierz Gruszczyński, architect and professor
Wojciech Męciński (Alberto Polacco), Jesuit, missionary in Japan
Wojciech Męciński, general of the Army of the Duchy of Warsaw
Cezar Męciński, officer of the Polish Army
Cezary Chlebowski, writer and historian
Wincenty Wiszniewski, astronomer
Józef Kuczewski, judge and wójt of Wiłkomierz, member of the Grodno Sejm
Stanisław Wybranowski, Standard-Bearer of Lublin
Stanisław Goczałkowski, Burgrave of Krakow
Jan Chlebowski, Royal Rotmistrz in the times of John II Casimir Vasa

Gallery
Variations

Paintings

External links 
  Poraj Coat of Arms and bearers

See also
 Polish heraldry
 Heraldic family
 List of Polish nobility coats of arms

Bibliography
 Bartosz Paprocki: Herby rycerstwa polskiego, Kraków, 1858
 Tadeusz Gajl: Herbarz polski od średniowiecza do XX wieku : ponad 4500 herbów szlacheckich 37 tysięcy nazwisk 55 tysięcy rodów. L&L, 2007. .

Polish coats of arms
Coats of arms with roses